4-Nitropyridine-N-oxide is a chemical compound. It is highly toxic when consumed orally.

References

Pyridinium compounds
Nitro compounds
Amine oxides